Admiral Doria may refer to:

Andrea Doria (1466–1560), Genoese admiral
Antonio Doria (died 1346), Admiral of France
Filippino Doria (fl. 1510s–1540s), Genoese admiral
Giovanni Andrea Doria (1539–1606), Italian admiral 
Lamba Doria (1245–1323), Genoese admiral
Oberto Doria (died 1306), Genoese admiral
Paganino Doria (fl. 1350s), Genoese admiral
Simone Doria (admiral) (born c. 1135), Genoese admiral